Richard Randall Larson (July 6, 1928 – October 2, 2016) was an American politician in the state of Wyoming. He served in the Wyoming House of Representatives  and Wyoming State Senate as a member of the Republican. He attended Ottawa University and was a farmer.

References

1928 births
2016 deaths
Republican Party members of the Wyoming House of Representatives
Republican Party Wyoming state senators
Farmers from Wyoming
Ottawa University alumni
People from Laramie County, Wyoming